Julian Cochran (born 1974) is an English-born Australian composer.

Cochran's earlier works show stylistic influences from Impressionist music and his later works are more noticeably influenced by Classical music and folk music of Eastern Europe. The piano works include twelve preludes, five mazurkas, two scherzi, six Romanian Dances, Animation Suite (comprising Tin Sentinel, Clockwork Doll, Wooden Dolls (Matreshki) and Flydian Galop), Animal Scenes (comprising Butterfly Dance, Hedgehog, Goat's Dance and Tail-chasing Kitten), Toccata & Fire Dance, the impressionistic work Maelstrom, four large Fantasia works (Dagda's Harp, Grande Scherzo, the three movement work Sul Settimo, and The Wind Sylph and the Dryad), three waltzes titled Valses, two piano sonatas, a cycle of five works titled Pegasus' Travels and Dances of Noble Sentiment (comprising Minuet, Courante, Rondeau and Forlana). Related to the piano works are seven pieces published for concert harp. Cochran also wrote orchestral and chamber music including the trio for violin, cor anglais and concert harp or piano Artemis, the sextet for string quartet, oboe and bassoon Zorya Vechernyaya, the four-part orchestral work Symphonic Tale, Two Valses for symphony orchestra, the Romanian Dances for chamber orchestra, Dagda's Harp Fantasy for symphony orchestra and choral works.

Cochran's music has been performed at Carnegie Hall in New York, the Amsterdam Concertgebouw, the Berlin Konzerthaus, and the Saint Petersburg Philharmonic Hall in Russia. The International Cochran Piano Competition is held in Warsaw, Poland.

References

External links
 Carnegie Hall 2013 sleeve notes, Cochran's mazurkas and preludes includes comments by the composer.

1974 births
20th-century classical composers
21st-century classical composers
Musicians from Adelaide
Australian male classical composers
Australian classical composers
English classical composers
Neoclassical composers
Ballet composers
British ballet composers
English classical pianists
Australian classical pianists
Male classical pianists
Composers for piano
Computer graphics professionals
Living people
English male classical composers
20th-century Australian musicians
21st-century Australian musicians
20th-century English composers
21st-century English composers
20th-century classical pianists
21st-century classical pianists
British male pianists
20th-century British male musicians
21st-century British male musicians
English emigrants to Australia
Expatriates in Monaco